Adrem also known as Tholpit is one of the Indonesian traditional snacks in Bantul, made of fried rice flour and brown sugar. Adrem snacks is widely produced in the Sanden area and can be found in traditional markets in Bantul and surrounding areas.

Production 
The main ingredients for making Adrem snacks are rice flour, grated coconut, and brown sugar. The mixture of grated rice flour and grated coconut is then mixed with brown sugar that has been melted, crushed, then fried in round shape like meatballs flattened on a banana leaf. The unique shape of the Adrem Snack is obtained during the frying process, due to its fixation with bamboo slats.

References 

Indonesian cuisine